Karges is a surname. Notable people with the surname include:

Carlo Karges (1951–2002), German musician 
Wilhelm Karges (1613/1614–1699), German organist and composer

See also
William A. Karges Fine Art
Karges Furniture